The Chief of the Army Command is the service chief of the Royal Danish Army. The current chief is Major general .

History
From the time that absolutism was instituted in 1660 until around 1800, the Monarch had absolute control of the military. Commands of armies could be delegated to designated generals in times of war. As such, general commands would occasionally be established in Norway and the Duchies. During the Scanian War and the Great Northern War there were a total of 19 Supreme Generals, as the commanders served at the King's pleasure.

In the beginning of the English Wars, Crown Prince Frederick established general commands throughout Denmark. Initially, they had limited power and were planned to be disbanded after the war, it was however decided to keep them. Following the ascension of Christian VIII, the general commands' power and authority were expanded to exceed real military control. This led to a change in the overall command structure, as the field commanders and chiefs of the general commands held the same authority. This problem came to light during the First Schleswig War and the appointment of Hans Hedemann as the commander of the field army. Since Hedemann did not have any control within general command areas, there were often conflicts between him and the chiefs of those commands. On 27 March 1849, Gerhard Christoph von Krogh who earlier had replaced Hedemann, was named supreme commander of "the entire active Army and over the fortifications and batteries in Jutland, on Als and on Funen as well as army magazines and depots set up in those areas". Additionally, it was stipulated that "the active army in all respects was to be independent of the General Commands, which [...] were to assist the army when it was either wholly or partly in the General Command District. While this arrangement ensured there would be no conflict between the supreme commander and the general commands, there were still no unified peacetime commander.

From 1855, there were 3 general commands; 1st General Command responsible for Zealand and surrounding islands, 2nd General Command for North Jutland, Funen and Schleswig, and 3rd General Command for Holstein and Saxe-Lauenburg. Following the loss of the duchies in the Second Schleswig War, 3rd General Command was disbanded and 2nd General Command area was reduced. In the 1905 Defence Agreement, it was decided that the chief of the 1st General Command would act as Army Commander-in-Chief in case of war.

With the 1922 Defence Agreement, the Army was subjugated to large cuts. As a result, 1st and 2nd General Command were merged to create the General Command, and thereby creating the first unified peacetime army commander. 

With the creation of the Defence Staff and Chief of Defence, the General Command was replaced by the Army Command. After the Army Command was subjugated to the Defence Command in 1976, the Army Command was replaced by the Army Staff. In 1982, the title of Chief of the Army was changed to become Inspector of the Army. Following the 1988 Defence Commission, it was decided that the Army Staff and the positions of Inspector would be removed and then create the Army Operational Command. Following the Danish Defence Agreement 2013–17, the Army Operational Command was disbanded and reorganised into the Army Staff. As part of the Danish Defence Agreement 2018–23, the Danish name was changed Army Command.

List of chiefs

Supreme Generals (1848–1932)
First Schleswig War

Second Schleswig War

World War I

Chief of the General Command (1923–1926)

Chief of the Army Command (1950–1970)

Chief of the Army Staff (1970–1990)

Chief of the Army Operational Command (1991–2014)

Chief of the Army Staff (2014–2018)

Chief of the Army Command (2019–present)

See also
 Chief of Defence (Denmark)
 Chief of the Royal Danish Navy
 Chief of the Royal Danish Air Force

Notes

References
Citations

Bibliography

 
 
 
 
 
 
 
 
 
 
 
 
 
 
 
 
 
 
 
 
 
 
 
 
 
 
 
 
 
 
 
 
 
 
 
 
 
 

Royal Danish Army
Military of Denmark
Denmark
Chiefs of Staff (Denmark)